Charlie Thorpe may refer to:

 Charlie Thorpe (character), a character in the soap opera Neighbours
 Charlie Thorpe (musician) (born 1990), Australian indie pop musician and songwriter